Origin of air may refer to:

 Geological history of oxygen
 Great Oxygenation Event